Wynarka is a very small town in South Australia  southeast of Adelaide on the Karoonda Highway (B55) and Loxton railway line in the Murray Mallee.  Wynarka lies within the District Council of Karoonda East Murray.

Founding
The government town of Wynarka was proclaimed on 9 January 1913 on land in the cadastral unit of the Hundred of Hooper located to the immediate south of the Wynarka Railway Station on the Loxton railway line.

Boundaries
The locality's boundaries were created on 11 November 1999 and includes the site of the government town of Wynarka which is located in its approximate centre.
The current boundaries of Wynarka include the former locality of Kulde, the next railway station towards Tailem Bend, named after the local Aboriginal word for "brothers".

Etymology
The name Wynarka is from an Aboriginal word meaning a strayer.

2015 deaths

On 15 July 2015, the remains of a young child in a suitcase were discovered near the side of the Karoonda Highway near Wynarka. The child was not identified until October as having been Khandalyce Kiara Pearce who had been reported missing with her mother from extended family in Alice Springs in 2009. Her mother's body had been found but not identified in 2010 in the Belanglo State Forest in New South Wales and is also believed to have been murdered.

Population
The 2016 Australian census which was conducted in August 2016 reports that Wynarka had a population of 76 people.

References

Towns in South Australia